Mitromorpha amphibolos is a species of sea snail, a marine gastropod mollusk in the family Mitromorphidae.

Description
The length of the shell attains 5 mm, its diameter 2.5 mm.

Distribution
This marine species occurs off Transkei, South Africa.

References

 Kilburn R.N. (1986). Turridae (Mollusca: Gastropoda) of southern Africa and Mozambique. Part 3. Subfamily Borsoniinae. Annals of the Natal Museum. 27: 633–720

External links
 
 Worldwide Mollusc Species Data Base: Mitromorpha amphibolos

Endemic fauna of South Africa
amphibolos
Gastropods described in 1986